Moheda is a locality situated in Alvesta Municipality, Kronoberg County, Sweden with 1,824 inhabitants in 2010.

Notable natives
Sven Nykvist
Torsten Ullman
Torsten Hägerstrand
Mats Wilander (from Torpsbruk in Moheda Parish)
Niklas Jihde

References 

Populated places in Kronoberg County
Populated places in Alvesta Municipality
Värend